Margaret Louise Brandeau is an American management scientist and engineer whose research applies operations research to decision-making in public health. The main focus of her work is on the development of applied mathematical and economic models to support health policy decisions. She is the Coleman F. Fung Professor in the Stanford University School of Engineering, and also holds a courtesy affiliation with the Stanford University School of Medicine.

With Edward H. Kaplan, Brandeau is the editor of the book Modeling the AIDS Epidemic: Planning, Policy, and Prediction (Raven Press, 1994).
She has also studied strategies for responding to the opioid epidemic in the United States, and the question of whether eating organic food has health benefits.

Education
Brandeau earned a bachelor's degree in mathematics in 1977 from the Massachusetts Institute of Technology (MIT). After continuing at MIT for a master's degree in operations research in 1978, she completed her Ph.D. in engineering economic systems in 1985 at Stanford University.

Recognition
In 2008, Brandeau was the winner of the Institute for Operations Research and the Management Sciences (INFORMS) President's Award "for her pioneering research on public health policy models, including those for HIV and drug abuse prevention and treatment, and for translating her results into improved U.S. and international health policies". She became a Fellow of INFORMS in 2009. In 2015 she won the INFORMS WORMS Award for the Advancement of Women in OR/MS, and the Philip McCord Morse Lectureship Award.

She was named an honorary professor of the National University of Engineering in Peru in 2016.

References

Year of birth missing (living people)
Living people
Management scientists
Operations researchers
American women engineers
Massachusetts Institute of Technology School of Science alumni
Stanford University faculty
Fellows of the Institute for Operations Research and the Management Sciences
MIT School of Engineering alumni
21st-century American women